Domenico Fattori was a Sammarinese politician who was the Secretary for Foreign Affairs of San Marino from 1860 to 1908. Fattori also served as a captain regent of San Marino 12 times, each for the usual six-month terms. He was the Captain Regent with the longest cumulative term (six years).

Notes

Year of birth missing
Year of death missing
Captains Regent of San Marino
Members of the Grand and General Council
Secretaries of State for Foreign and Political Affairs of San Marino
Government ministers of San Marino
Sammarinese diplomats